Aval Kanda Lokam is a 1978 Indian Malayalam film,  directed by M. Krishnan Nair (director) and produced by Sheriff. The film stars Jayan, K. P Ummer, Ravikumar, Seema  and Padmapriya in the lead roles. The film has musical score by M. K. Arjunan.

Raji is a doctor who sacrifices her love for her family friend Vinodh, after she realises the he is in love with Bindhu. When Bindhu suffers from psychological, retrogic hysteria, Vinodh has some doubts about her. Rajis Father asks Bindhus mother about her future life and she tells him about her shattered experiences.

Cast
Jayan as Vinodh
K. P Ummer as DR. Gopinath
Ravikumar as Ramesh
Cochin Haneefa
Seema
Vijayalalitha
Praveena
Sukumari
Paravoor Bharathan

Soundtrack
The music was composed by M. K. Arjunan and the lyrics were written by Sreekumaran Thampi.

References

External links
 

1978 films
1970s Malayalam-language films
Films directed by M. Krishnan Nair